This article lists the complete results of the group stage of the 2012 Thomas Cup in Wuhan, China.

Group A

China vs. England

Indonesia vs. England

China vs. Indonesia

Group B

Japan vs. New Zealand

Russia vs. New Zealand

Japan vs. Russia

Group C

Denmark vs. South Africa

Malaysia vs. South Africa

Denmark vs. Malaysia

Group D

Korea vs. United States

Germany vs. United States

Korea vs. Germany

References

2012 Thomas & Uber Cup